Michael Bakewell (born 1931) is a British television producer. 

Bakewell was born in Birmingham, Warwickshire in England. 

He is best known for his work during the 1960s, when he was the first Head of Plays at the BBC, after Sydney Newman divided the drama department into separate series, serials and plays divisions in 1963. Later, he produced plays for BBC2's Theatre 625 anthology strand, including John Hopkins' highly regarded Talking to a Stranger quartet of linked plays.

He has also worked in radio drama, including adapting The Lord of the Rings into a 1981 radio series for the BBC and a series of 27 adaptations of Agatha Christie's Hercule Poirot stories broadcast between 1985 and 2007 by BBC Radio 4. He was also the dubbing director for the English versions of the Japanese television series The Water Margin and Monkey, which were screened by the BBC, among many of Manga Video UK's dubs (and many dubs for both Central Park Media and Manga Video UK), e.g., Cyber City Oedo, Devilman, Dominion Tank Police,  Patlabor (Manga PAL version - movies 1 and 2), Tokyo Babylon, Genocyber, Roujin Z, Angel Cop, Violence Jack and many others.

From 1955 until 1972, he was the first husband of Joan Bakewell; the couple had two children, Matthew and Harriet. 

In the 1960s, Joan had an eight-year affair with the playwright Harold Pinter. 

Following their divorce, Michael remarried to Melissa Dundas in 1975. The couple live in East Sussex.

References

External links

Michael Bakewell's radio plays

1931 births 
Living people 
BBC television producers
British television producers
British voice directors
Spouses of life peers